Klaus-Peter Kerkemeier (born 13 November 1951) is a retired German football midfielder.

References

External links
 

1951 births
Living people
German footballers
VfL Bochum players
SC Westfalia Herne players
2. Bundesliga players
Place of birth missing (living people)
SpVgg Erkenschwick players
Association football midfielders